Out of the Storm may refer to:

 Out of the Storm (short story collection), a 1975 collection of fantasy short stories by William Hope Hodgson
 Out of the Storm (Jack Bruce album), 1974
 Out of the Storm (Ed Thigpen album), 1966
 Out of the Storm (1920 film), a lost American silent drama film
 Out of the Storm (1926 film), an American silent drama film
 Out of the Storm (1948 film), an American crime film